MonsterTalk is an audio podcast originally presented by the Skeptics Society's Skeptic magazine but broke ties in 2019. Since 2019 it has been an independent podcast under the "Monster House, LLC" banner. The show critically examines the science behind cryptozoological creatures, such as Bigfoot, the Loch Ness Monster, and werewolves. It is hosted by Blake Smith and Karen Stollznow, and produced by Blake Smith.  In 2012, MonsterTalk was awarded the Parsec Award for the "Best Fact Behind the Fiction Podcast".

History
The first episode was released on July 2, 2009, and featured an interview with NYU Professor Todd Disotell about the attempted use of DNA evidence in cryptozoologists' search for Bigfoot.

MonsterTalk interviews scientists and investigators that research cryptozoological claims. The show has covered an extensive array of monsters and cryptids, including zombies, demons, ninjas, the Mothman, Cthulhu, the Skookum cast, the Patterson–Gimlin film., the Minnesota Iceman, the Chupacabra; and extinct animals such as pterosaurs, plesiosaurs, and the thylacine.

Guests of the show have included Phil Plait, Professor PZ Myers, Steven Novella, magician James Randi, author Brian Regal, writer and illustrator Daniel Loxton, and investigator Joe Nickell.

In the media
In 2011, Curt Holman conducted an interview with MonsterTalks producer, Blake Smith, for an article in Creative Loafing.  Ghostly Talk radio interviewed the Monster Talk crew in 2009. Blake Smith and Karen Stollznow were also interviewed on the podcast/radio show Skeptically Speaking on May 7, 2010. MonsterTalk is rebroadcast on WPRR in Grand Rapids, Michigan.

Awards
MonsterTalk was nominated for a Parsec Award in 2010 and again in 2011.

MonsterTalk won the 2012 Parsec Award for "Best Fact Behind the Fiction Podcast", for programs that "explore the facts that influence the fictions—the science, history, culture, and mythology that inspire these stories."

See also
 Skeptic (U.S. magazine)
 The Skeptics Society
 Cryptozoology
 Cryptids

References

External links
 

2009 podcast debuts
Scientific skepticism mass media
Audio podcasts
Science podcasts
American podcasts